Bertille Marcos Guèdègbé is a Beninese agricultural engineer and entrepreneur.  She is President of the Cooperative of Benin's Pineapple Producers, Exporters, and Processors.

Life 
In 2014, she founded Network of Women Artisans of Benin. She is founder and CEO of the company Fruits Tillou. It is an exporter of pineapple and its products from Benin. She is farm management advisor on the CAGEA project. She founded of the GERME NGO.

References 

Living people
Agricultural engineers
Women in agriculture
Year of birth missing (living people)
Beninese businesspeople